Wilfrid Denis Walker (born December 29, 1933) is a former Rhodesian cabinet minister resident in the United Kingdom. He is known for his monarchist activities and anti-communism and is also company secretary, director and treasurer of the International Monarchist League and its UK subsidiary, the Constitutional Monarchy Association. 

He holds the prefix The Honourable on account of his former Rhodesian government post.

Early life
Having grown up in Tooting and Chingford, London, Walker was called up for national service in the Royal Fusiliers in 1952. Although he was to be posted to fight in the Korean War, this was cancelled before he departed. He was discharged in 1954. Walker went on to become a Methodist missionary in southern Africa, including time in the townships of Johannesburg. He left the mission service and later settled in Bulawayo, Rhodesia, acquiring Rhodesian citizenship after the Unilateral Declaration of Independence in 1965.

Political career in Rhodesia/Zimbabwe
In the Rhodesia general election of 1974, he gained the seat of Bulawayo North as a Rhodesian Front candidate, polling 93.4% of the vote among the electorate. He was re-elected in the 1977 and 1979 elections. Walker served as Minister for Education from 1977 in Ian Smith's government and also held office under Abel Muzorewa in 1979–80.

Following the end of white minority rule and the creation of Zimbabwe, he was appointed Deputy Chairman of Parliamentary Committees, but came under pressure from the new government of Robert Mugabe. He was to have been arrested (on suspicion of attempting to overthrow the government) on 10 December 1981 together with the MP for Bulawayo South, but had fortuitously left on a prearranged holiday. When he returned in January 1982, he briefly re-attended Parliament before learning that the Mugabe government had stationed police around the building to arrest him on sight. Walker fled the country and returned to Britain.

Return to Britain
On 10 February 1982, Walker delivered a letter to Margaret Thatcher at 10 Downing Street highlighting the political situation in Zimbabwe.

He entered into a number of small business concerns, such as (in April 1988) Fax Network International Limited, based in Chingford (in March 1999 this company was renamed Computer Systems UK Ltd).

Monday Club

On 29 September 1986, Walker was the guest-of-honour at a Conservative Monday Club Foreign Affairs Committee Dinner at Bailey's Hotel, Gloucester Road, South Kensington, chaired by Richard Stallabrass, who had previously served in Rhodesia. He subsequently joined the Club and in 1990 joined the Executive Council. On 1 November 1989, Walker produced a paper for the club's Foreign Affairs Committee, chaired by Gregory Lauder-Frost, on Land Reform in Zimbabwe. In his last paragraph, he stated:

Other activities
A robust anti-communist, Walker was a guest on 25 September 1989 at the Western Goals Institute Dinner at Simpsons-in-the-Strand, London, in honour of the President of El Salvador, Alfredo Cristiani, and his inner cabinet. Others present included Sir Alfred Sherman (policy advisor to Margaret Thatcher), Monday Club vice-president Professor Antony Flew, Dr Zigmunt Szkopiak (foreign affairs minister for the Polish government-in-exile), the Monday Club's Colonel Barry Turner RE (Retd), Sam Swerling (former Monday Club chairman), Andrew VR Smith, Stuart Notholt and Gideon Sherman (WGI Directors), Gregory Lauder-Frost and Harvey Ward of the Monday Club's Foreign Affairs Committee and both vice-presidents of Western Goals.

Walker is the Director of the South Africa-oriented Good Hope Christian Group, and the Rhodesia Christian Group, organisations which were set up to assist refugees from those countries. He is also General Secretary of The Zimbabwe-Rhodesia Relief Fund, a registered charity, of which the chairman is Sir Nicholas Winterton (The former Conservative Member of Parliament for Macclesfield).

Walker was appointed in mid-1989 as the Chairman of the Schools Liaison Steering Committee for the British Institute of Management, City of London Branch. His portrait photograph appears on the front page of their Autumn 1989 Newsletter with another in the August/September 2005 Rhodesia Christian Group Newsletter.

Walker was introduced as an Ordinary Member onto the Grand Council of the International Monarchist League on 14 March 1990 by Gregory Lauder-Frost (seconded by Lord Sudeley), and is now the director of that organisation.

He administers the International Monarchist League, the Monday Club, and other business activities from an office at Bishop's Stortford, Hertfordshire, and now lives at Woodford Green, London.

Walker is married to Jill Walker (who was born in Rhodesia) and has one son.

References

Fax Network International booklet, London, 1989, company number 2248589.
Western Goals Institute archives.
Rhodesia Herald
Companies House UK http://www.companieshouse.gov.uk/
Rhodesia Christian Group Newsletter.

1933 births
Living people
British Methodist missionaries
British monarchists
Rhodesian anti-communists
Rhodesian Methodists
Rhodesian politicians
White Rhodesian people
Zimbabwean exiles
Zimbabwean Methodists
Zimbabwean politicians
Methodist missionaries in Zimbabwe
British emigrants to Rhodesia
Rhodesian Front politicians
Members of the Parliament of Rhodesia
Members of the National Assembly of Zimbabwe